I Love My Wife is a musical with a book and lyrics by Michael Stewart and music by Cy Coleman, based on a play by Luis Rego.

A satire of the sexual revolution of the 1970s, the musical takes place on Christmas Eve in suburban Trenton, New Jersey, where two married couples who have been close friends since high school find themselves contemplating a ménage-à-quatre.

Synopsis
In Trenton, New Jersey, old high school buddies Wally (now an executive in public relations) and Alvin (a furniture mover) discuss the possibility of adding some spice to their lives by having a foursome. Alvin suggests to his wife Cleo that they share their bed with Monica, Wally's wife. Cleo thinks that she would enjoy Wally. They agree that whoever enters first becomes the evening's partner, but the couple walks in together. After Monica leaves, the three discuss the situation and decide on a foursome on Christmas Eve.

Alvin and Cleo arrive for dinner on Christmas Eve, and while Monica is initially unhappy with the arrangement, she ultimately agrees. Too excited to eat: they undress, get into bed, and have some pot to relax. As Wally suggests ideas from a sex manual, the group discards all the options.

Song list

Act I      
We're Still Friends - Company
Monica - Alvin, Monica and Four Guys
By Threes - Wally, Alvin and Harvey
A Mover's Life - Alvin and Four Guys 
Love Revolution - Cleo
Someone Wonderful I Missed - Monica and Cleo
Sexually Free - Alvin, Cleo and Wally

Act II      
Hey There, Good Times - Harvey, Stanley, Quentin and Norman
Lovers on Christmas Eve - Monica, Wally and Norman
Scream - Harvey, Stanley, Quentin and Norman
Everybody Today is Turning On - Alvin and Wally
Married Couple Seeks Married Couple - Alvin, Cleo, Wally and Monica
I Love My Wife - Alvin and Wally

Productions
The pre-Broadway tryout opened at the Forrest Theatre in Philadelphia on March 21, 1977. The Broadway production opened at the Ethel Barrymore Theatre on April 17, 1977, and closed on May 20, 1979, after 857 performances and seven previews. Directed by Gene Saks and choreographed by Onna White, the cast included James Naughton as Wally, Joanna Gleason as Monica, Lenny Baker, as Alvin, Ilene Graff as Cleo, Michael Mark (guitar) as Stanley, Joseph Saulter (drums) as Quenton, John Miller (bass) as Harvey, and Ken Bichel (piano) as Norman. During the show's run, cast replacements included Tom and Dick Smothers, Tom Wopat, Janie Sell and, in an African American version, Lawrence Hilton-Jacobs, Hattie Winston, and Barbara Sharma. Original director and choreographer Joe Layton was replaced due to injuries sustained in a fall.

The West End production opened at the Prince of Wales Theatre on October 6, 1977, where it ran for 401 performances. It was nominated for the Laurence Olivier Award for Musical of the Year. The show originally starred Porridge and Rising Damp star Richard Beckinsale, who was replaced as the lead mid-run by Confessions of a Window Cleaner actor Robin Askwith.

The band consisted of four on-stage musicians who were among the friends and acted in the opening scene. The show was filled with their shenanigans in the background during the songs. They sang along with some of the numbers and sometimes one of them took a solo and sang alone.

The Helen Hayes Theatre in Nyack, New York, presented the musical in April 2004.

A production was staged by the Reprise Theatre Company, Brentwood Theatre, Brentwood, California, in December 2008. This starred Jason Alexander (Alvin), Vicki Lewis (Cleo), Patrick Cassidy (Wally), and Lea Thompson (Monica).

Response

Critical reviews
Clive Barnes, reviewing for The New York Times, wrote that the musical is "bright, inventive, amusing and breezy." He noted that what Coleman and Stewart did regarding the band "is breathtakingly simple, but none...has ever done it before. They have taken the band and put it up on stage...The musicians are welded into the play, as a kind of Greek chorus." He especially noted that "It is a gorgeous cast-just right." Finally, he called the musical "mildly sexy, vastly diverting and highly amusing."

Awards and nominations

Original Broadway production

Original London production

Watch and listen
 I Love My Wife excerpt - YouTube
 I Love My Wife excerpt - YouTube
 I Love My Wife: A Musical (1977 Original Broadway Cast Recording) CD (April 10, 1992) DRG Records (ASIN: B000000PG7)
 Broadway Bound 216: Yesterday & Today plus Cy Coleman - The Public Radio Exchange (PRX)
"Everybody Today is Turning On": Bea Arthur & Rock Hudson - The Beatrice Arthur Special

References

External links
Internet Broadway Database listing
I Love My Wife at guidetomusicaltheatre.com
 2015 City Center interview with Lea DeLaria about I Love My Wife

1977 musicals
Broadway musicals
Musicals by Cy Coleman
Musicals by Michael Stewart (playwright)
Christmas musicals
Tony Award-winning musicals